}}
Diruthenium tetraacetate chloride is the coordination polymer with the formula {[Ru2(O2CCH3)4]Cl}n.  A red brown solid, the compound is obtained by the reduction of ruthenium trichloride in acetic acid.  The compound has attracted much academic interest because it features a fractional metal-metal bond order of 2.5. 

The [Ru2(O2CCH3)4]+ core adopts the Chinese lantern structure, with four acetate ligands spanning the Ru2 center. The Ru-Ru distance is 228 pm. The [Ru2(O2CCH3)4]+ cages are linked by bridging chloride ligands.

References

Ruthenium compounds
Acetates
Dimers (chemistry)
Chemical compounds containing metal–metal bonds
Mixed valence compounds
Chloro complexes
Coordination polymers